Several different recruiting songs with the name "Your King and Country Want/Need You" were popularised in Britain at the beginning of the First World War. Your King and Country Need You with words by Huntley Trevor and music by Henry E. Pether was published at the start of the war as a recruiting song with the aim of persuading men to volunteer to enlist to fight in the War.

Recordings
Below is a list of artists who have recorded the song, with record company (where known), and recording date (where known):
 Joseph Farrington, Cinch (HMV), 1914
 , Famous Record, c. 1914
 Harrison Latimer, Regal (G6795), c. 1914

Online
 Sung by

References and notes

Songs about kings
Songs about the United Kingdom
1914 songs
Songs of World War I
British patriotic songs